Qaṣabah az-Zarqā' is one of the districts  of Zarqa governorate, Jordan.

References 

Districts of Jordan